The 1913 New Zealand rugby league tour of Australia was a tour by the New Zealand national rugby league team.

This was the first New Zealand side to wear the kiwi and silver fern emblem on their playing jersey.

Squad
The touring party included, backs; Albert Asher, George Bradley, Arthur Carlaw, Henry Duvall, Karl Ifwersen, Alfred Jackson, Bill Kelly (vice captain), Charles Manning, Walter Miller, Billy Mitchell, Roy Proebstel, Rukingi Reke and forwards; Jim Auld, Conrad Byrne, Les Campbell, Jim Clark, Harold Hayward (captain), John Hogan, Cecil King, Bob Mitchell, Abbie Shadbolt and Stan Walters.

Percy Williams, who was contracted to Wigan, joined the squad mid-way through the tour.

They were managed by A.W.S. Brice and Henry Thacker and accompanied by Thacker's wife, Monica.

Four original selections withdrew from the side; Charlie Pearce, Jim Rukutai, Charles Savory and Charles Webb.

Fixtures

On their return home, New Zealand defeated Canterbury 32–5, with Auld and Shadbolt playing for their home district.

References

New Zealand national rugby league team tours
Great Britain
New Zealand tour
Rugby league tours of Australia